Evonne Goolagong and Margaret Court defeated Jill Emmerson and Lesley Hunt 6–0, 6–0 in the final to win the women's doubles title at the 1971 Australian Open.

Seeds
The first and second seeds received a bye into the second round.

Draw

References

External links
 1971 Australian Open – Women's draws and results at the International Tennis Federation

Australian Open - Women's Doubles 1971
Women's Doubles
Australian Open (tennis) by year – Women's doubles
1971 in women's tennis
1971 in Australian women's sport